Pyotr Ilyich Tchaikovsky wrote his Symphony No. 1 in G minor, Winter Daydreams (or Winter Dreams) (Zimniye gryozy), Op. 13, in 1866, just after he accepted a professorship at the Moscow Conservatory: it is the composer's earliest notable work. The composer's brother Modest claimed this work cost Tchaikovsky more labor and suffering than any of his other works. Even so, he remained fond of it, writing to his patroness Nadezhda von Meck in 1883 that "although it is in many ways very immature, yet fundamentally it has more substance and is better than any of my other more mature works." He dedicated the symphony to Nikolai Rubinstein.

Form

Instrumentation
The symphony is scored for piccolo, two flutes, two oboes, two clarinets (A, B), two bassoons, four horns (E, F), two trumpets (C, D), three trombones (fourth movement only), tuba (fourth movement only), timpani, cymbals, bass drum and strings.

Overview

Composition
Tchaikovsky started writing this symphony in March 1866. Work proved sluggish. A scathing review by César Cui of the cantata he had written as a graduation piece from the St. Petersburg Conservatory shattered his morale. He also composed day and night. All these factors strained Tchaikovsky's mental and physical health tremendously. He started suffering from insomnia, from pains in his head which he thought to be strokes, and became convinced he would not live to finish the symphony.
A successful performance of his revised Overture in F in St. Petersburg lifted his spirits. So did a change of scenery for the summer with his family. Nevertheless, he soon worked himself again into nervous and physical exhaustion by continuing to compose day and night. A doctor declared him "one step away from insanity," ordering complete rest. Tchaikovsky complied.

Despite his lack of progress, Tchaikovsky sought the opinion of his former teachers, Anton Rubinstein and Nikolai Zaremba, when he returned to St Petersburg at the end of August. He had hoped for their approval of what he had written as well as accepting at least part of it for a St Petersburg concert of the Russian Musical Society (RMS). Neither situation happened. Both men were negative, refusing to perform any of the symphony. He stopped work to fulfill his first public commission, a festival overture based on the Danish national anthem to celebrate the Moscow visit of the future Tsar Alexander III of Russia with his new Danish bride. Once the commission was finished, Tchaikovsky completed the symphony before the conservatory's Christmas break. This included modifications requested by Rubinstein and Zaremba as a condition for reconsidering the work.

Tchaikovsky resubmitted the manuscript to Rubinstein and Zaremba during the Christmas break. Even with their insisted changes, they still disapproved of the symphony on the whole; however, this time they passed the adagio and scherzo as "being fit for performance". These two movements were played at an RMS concert in St Petersburg on February 23, 1867, with no success. Tchaikovsky, who had looked upon St Petersburg as the premier musical location in Russia and been obsessed with having his symphony performed there first, was thoroughly disillusioned — not only with St Petersburg audiences, but also with the critical judgments of both his former teachers. He discarded all the revisions they had demanded, standing with one exception by his original version. The exception, it turned out, was unavoidable. At Zaremba's insistence, he had composed a new second subject for the opening movement. He had discarded the papers that contained his original second subject, and he could not remember what he had originally composed. Tchaikovsky had to let the second subject as approved by Zaremba stand as it was.

Back in Moscow, Anton's brother Nikolai was willing to perform the symphony; only the composer's insistence on a St Petersburg performance held him back. Tchaikovsky now allowed him to conduct the scherzo at a Moscow concert of the RMS on December 22. Though the scherzo met with little success, Rubinstein was still ready to perform the complete work. This finally took place on February 15, 1868, to great success. Surprisingly, though, the symphony would have to wait 15 years for its next performance. The first performance of the revised version took place in Moscow on December 1, 1883, under the baton of Max Erdmannsdörfer.

Struggles with form
Tchaikovsky freely confessed later in life that he could not write within the proper rules of Western sonata form—those rules of exposition and organic growth and development of themes that Germanic composers such as Haydn and Mozart had invented. Anton Rubinstein was a slavish follower of those rules in his own works. That may in turn have been a handicap for Tchaikovsky in writing Winter Dreams. He could not write a symphony that would please Rubinstein by staying firmly within a classical format while writing music that would stay true to his strengths as a composer.

This does not mean that Tchaikovsky was completely unable to work within musical form. While his natural aptitude for organic symphonic procedures may have certainly been limited, he may have actually done himself less than full justice. This was Tchaikovsky's first large-scale work. Rubinstein and Zaremba's interference did not help: they only added to anxieties Tchaikovsky would have naturally had, in any case.

The First Symphony forced Tchaikovsky to face the facts in one very important way. Before beginning it, he had been content to mould his music as best he could to the practice of previous composers. Winter Dreams forced him to realize he would have to work "around the rules" for him to grow and develop as a composer. This meant adapting sonata form and symphonic structure to accommodate the music he was gifted to write. He would often show tremendous resourcefulness in doing this, even in this symphony. As musicologist David Brown wrote, "The opening stretch of the first movement is enough to scotch the hoary old legend that Tchaikovsky was devoid of any real symphonic aptitude."

Influences

Teachers
As opposed to the forward-looking tendencies of The Five, Anton Rubinstein and his followers remained suspicious, even hostile, to new trends in music. Instead, they attempted to preserve in their own works what they saw as the best in the Western tradition in the immediate past. Though not active as a composer, Nikolai Zaremba was no exception to this rule. He idolized Beethoven, particularly the late works, but his personal tastes had progressed no further than Mendelssohn. Rubinstein, a highly prolific composer in his own right, was almost as backward-looking as Zaremba, writing in a Germanic style similar to Schumann and Mendelssohn. Though as a teacher Rubinstein would try to foster his students' imaginations, he also expected them to remain as conservative as he was.

Mendelssohn
Over the summer holiday with his family in 1866, when evening activities turned to music, Tchaikovsky invariably played Mendelssohn's Italian Symphony, Schumann's First or Third Symphonies, or Das Paradies und die Peri. Mendelssohn's presence is strong in Winter Daydreams, with a grace, lightness and pace throughout. The scherzo especially could have stepped from A Midsummer Night's Dream. Both the symphony's subtitle and those of the first two movements—"Dreams of a Winter Journey" and "Land of Desolation, Land of Mists"—betray a possible fondness of Mendelssohn's ability to express in symphonic form a personal experience arising out of emotion at a romantic landscape, though Tchaikovsky did not carry through this idea to the end (the latter two movements lack subtitles).

Russia
Even with these influences, Russian writer Daniel Zhitomirsky explains, "the subject, the genre and intonation" of Tchaikovsky's writing are closely intwined with Russian life and folk music." Warrack notes that "the obsessive thirds of Russian folk-song permeate Tchaikovsky's tunes; and he must also at some time been haunted by the interval of the falling fourth, so strongly does it colour the invention in the early symphonies, always prominently placed in the melodies and acting as emotional coloration rather than implying a harmonic progression."

Notable recordings
 Antal Dorati conducting the London Symphony Orchestra
 Claudio Abbado conducting the Chicago Symphony Orchestra
 Igor Markevitch conducting the London Symphony Orchestra
 Michael Tilson Thomas conducting the Boston Symphony Orchestra
 Herbert von Karajan conducting the Berliner Philharmoniker
 Eugene Ormandy conducting the Philadelphia Orchestra
 Mariss Jansons conducting the Oslo Philharmonic Orchestra
 Yevgeny Svetlanov  conducting the USSR State Symphony Orchestra
 Yuri Temirkanov conducting the Royal Philharmonic Orchestra
 Bernard Haitink conducting the Royal Concertgebouw Orchestra
 Lorin Maazel conducting the Vienna Philharmonic Orchestra
 Zubin Mehta conducting the Los Angeles Philharmonic Orchestra
 Riccardo Muti conducting the New Philharmonia Orchestra, London
 Sir Neville Marriner conducting the Academy of St Martin in the Fields
 Vladimir Jurowski conducting the London Philharmonic Orchestra
 Neeme Järvi conducting the Gothenburg Symphony Orchestra
 Mikhail Pletnev conducting the Russian National Orchestra

Notes

References
 Brown, David, Tchaikovsky: The Early Years, 1840–1874 (New York, W.W. Norton & Company, Inc., 1978)
 Holden, Anthony, Tchaikovsky: A Biography (New York: Random House, 1995)
 Keller, Hans, ed. Simpson, Robert, The Symphony, Volume One (Harmondsworth, 1966)
 Maes, Francis, tr. Arnold J Pomerans and Erica Pomerans, A History of Russian Music: From Kamarinskaya to Babi Yar (Berkeley, Los Angeles and London: University of California Press, 2002). .
 Poznansky, Alexander, Tchaikovsky: The Quest for the Inner Man (New York, Schirmer Books, 1991)
 Strutte, Wilson, Tchaikovsky, His Life and Times (Speldhurst, Kent, United Kingdom: Midas Books, 1979)
 Warrack, John, Tchaikovsky (New York: Charles Scribner's Sons, 1973)
 Warrack, John, Tchaikovsky Symphonies and Concertos (Seattle: University of Washington Press, 1971, 1969)
 Weinstock, Herbert, Tchaikovsky (New York: Albert A. Knopf, 1944)
 Zhitomirsky, Daniel, ed. Shostakovich, Dmitri, Russian Symphony: Thoughts About Tchaikovsky (New York: Philosophical Library, 1947)

External links
 
 Tchaikovsky Research

1868 compositions
Symphonies by Pyotr Ilyich Tchaikovsky
Compositions in G minor
Compositions using folk songs